The Herøyfjorden or Herøyfjord is a fjord which bisects the municipality of Herøy in Møre og Romsdal county, Norway.

The fjord has many islands located within it including Herøya and Nautøya in the east.  The Flåvær islands are located in the central part of the Herøyfjorden.  It is a group of islets and skerries including Flåvær, Husholmen, Torvholmen and Varholmen.  The Flåvær Lighthouse is located on Varholmen.

The village of Eggesbønes lies on the north shore of the fjord, just south of the town of Fosnavåg.

See also
List of Norwegian fjords

References

Sunnmøre
Fjords of Møre og Romsdal